is a Japanese actress, fashion model and singer.

Life
Hashimoto was born in Kumamoto, Kumamoto Prefecture, the second of three daughters. In 2008, Hashimoto won the HUAHUA audition held by Newcome; her mother had chosen Hashimoto for the audition because she had the strongest facial complexion out of the three sisters.

In 2009, Hashimoto was selected as the youngest "Miss Seventeen" by fashion magazine Seventeen, alongside Emi Kudo, Arisa Takada and Alice Hirose, out of 5,267 applicants. The same year, she debuted as an actress in the movie Give and Go, portraying a deaf girl who is absorbed in basketball.

Hashimoto appeared in Confessions in 2010 and starred in The Kirishima Thing in 2012, for which she won new face awards from the Japan Academy and Kinema Junpo. She also appeared as Sadako in Sadako 3D.

Filmography

Films

Television

Video on demand

TV anime

Radio

Discography

Awards

References

External links
Official Site 

1996 births
Living people
Actors from Kumamoto Prefecture
21st-century Japanese actresses
Japanese female models
Japanese women singers
People from Kumamoto Prefecture